Aspen Mays (born 1980) is an American artist.

Early life and education 
Aspen Mays was born in Asheville, North Carolina, and raised in Charleston, South Carolina. Mays received her MFA from the School of the Art Institute of Chicago.

She also studied photography in Cape Town, South Africa while volunteering in a clinic for bead working artisans living with HIV.

Career 
Mays's solo exhibitions include Every leaf on a tree at the Museum of Contemporary Art, Chicago; From the Offices of Scientists at the Hyde Park Art Center, Chicago; Concentrate and Ask Again at Golden Gallery, Chicago. Mays was a 2009–2010 Fulbright Fellow in Santiago, Chile, where she worked with astronomers who are using the world’s most advanced telescopes to look at the sky.
 
During her time at the observatory, she was given access to the institutional archive of rejected prints, negatives, and other ephemera. This resulted in her body of work, "Sun Ruins," which functions as an umbrella for two distinct yet related bodies of work. In 2006, she was awarded a Rotary Ambassadorial Scholarship for study in Cape Town, South Africa. More recently, honors include a Fulbright Fellowship at the University of Chile, Santiago. She currently lives and works in Los Angeles.
 
The Atlanta-based Art Papers describes her work as standing "in deft opposition to the technology we have come to rely on for answers, putting faith not in complex databases and rapidly evolving technology, but rather in the ability of everyday objects and materials to spark our imagination." In doing so, she "re-imagines the world around us, finding new possibilities in the commonplace."

Mays is currently an Associate Professor in Graduate Fine Arts and Undergraduate Photography at California College of the Arts

Solo exhibitions 

 Tengallon Sunflower and California Dreaming at Higher Pictures in New York, September 15 – October 27, 2018
Newspaper Rock at Light Work in Syracuse, New York, January 13 – March 6, 2014
Ships that Pass in the Night at the Center for Ongoing Projects and Research (COR&P) in Columbus, OH, April 27 - June 28, 2013
 Every leaf on a tree at the Museum of Contemporary Art, Chicago, Feb 6–Feb 28, 2010

Publications 
 
 Aloi, Giovanni. "Water Works." Antennae: The Journal of Nature in Visual Culture , Summer 2016, Issue 36, p 81-94,
 
 
 
 
 
Yood, James (November 2009) "Aspen Mays, [at] Golden." Artforum 48, no. 3: 236–237.
 
Where We've Been, Where We're Going, Why?, 02/2016, Dan Boardman and Aspen Mays, Houseboat Press & Conveyor Editions
Dodging Tools, 09/2018, Penumbra Foundation

Awards 

 Aperture Foundation - Paris Photo First Photobook Award Shortlist for the book Where We’ve Been, Where We’re Going, Why?, Dan Boardman and Aspen Mays, Houseboat Press & Conveyor Editions

References

External links
 

American artists
Living people
1980 births
School of the Art Institute of Chicago alumni
California College of the Arts faculty
21st-century American women photographers
21st-century American photographers
University of North Carolina alumni
People from Asheville, North Carolina
People from Charleston, South Carolina
21st-century American artists
21st-century American women artists
American women artists